Max Bodilly (born 9 September 1994) is a rugby union player for Ealing Trailfinders. His position of choice is full-back or centre but he can also cover wing. He made his debut vs Ospreys in 2014. 

He scored 2 tries in the 2015 15 LV Cup final against Saracens who won the competition. 

Bodilly was born in Truro.

Bodilly has featured for the Exeter Chiefs 10 times in the Aviva Premiership. He made his debut in the 2014-15 season against Sale Sharks. He played 65 minutes against Saracens in 2016 when Phil Dollman was injured. He earned his first Premiership start against Gloucester on 1 September 2017.

References

Living people
1994 births
Exeter Chiefs players